Stenoptilia sanaa is a moth of the family Pterophoridae. It is known from Yemen.

References

sanaa
Insects of the Arabian Peninsula
Moths described in 1999
Moths of Asia